Amyot d'Inville (F782) is a  in the French Navy. She was transferred to the Turkish Navy as TCG Bartın (F-504).

Design 
Armed by a crew of 90 sailors, these vessels have the reputation of being among the most difficult in bad weather. Their high windage makes them particularly sensitive to pitch and roll as soon as the sea is formed.

Their armament, consequent for a vessel of this tonnage, allows them to manage a large spectrum of missions. During the Cold War, they were primarily used to patrol the continental shelf of the Atlantic Ocean in search of Soviet Navy submarines. Due to the poor performance of the hull sonar, as soon as an echo appeared, the reinforcement of an ASM frigate was necessary to chase it using its towed variable depth sonar.

Their role as patrollers now consists mainly of patrols and assistance missions, as well as participation in UN missions (blockades, flag checks) or similar marine policing tasks (fight against drugs, extraction of nationals, fisheries control, etc.). The mer-mer 38 or mer-mer 40 missiles have been landed, but they carry several machine guns and machine guns, more suited to their new missions.

Its construction cost was estimated at 270,000,000 French francs.

Construction and career

Service in the French Navy 
Amyot d'Inville was laid down on 1 September 1973 at Arsenal de Lorient, Lorient. Launched on 30 November 1974 and commissioned on 13 October 1976.

She was first transferred to Brest to the 2nd D.I.V.A.V.I, in 1982 she joined the 1st D.I.V.A.V.I in Cherbourg.

In 1987, she carried out a mission in the Antilles-Guyana then was assigned to fisheries control in Newfoundland.

In 1992, she joined the G.A.S.M in Brest and carried out various missions in West Africa.

In 1999, she left for the Antilles-Guyana area and again for West Africa for her final cruise.

Service in the Turkish Naval Forces 
Bartın was purchased from France in November 2000 and arrived in Turkey on 3 June 2002 after salvage work was carried out at DCN. She was then commissioned on the 26th later that month.  

On 27 March 2018, she transited Bosporus towards the Black Sea to join Deniz Yıldızı-2018 naval exercise.

Citations 

Ships built in Lorient
1974 ships
D'Estienne d'Orves-class avisos
Ships transferred from the French Navy to the Turkish Navy
Burak-class corvettes of the Turkish Navy